Damon Ming (born 24 October 1978) is a Bermudian footballer who plays for Dandy Town Hornets.

Club career
Ming was born in Paget. He has played for Barnet, Maidenhead United, Aylesbury United, Hayes and Northwood in the English leagues.

In November 2008, he joined Dandy Town Hornets after being released from his Bermuda Hogges franchise contract that prevented him playing in Bermuda.

He re-joined the Hogges prior to the 2009 season, and played in 20 games for the team during the year; he remained with the team when the Hogges self-relegated to the USL Premier Development League in 2010.

International career
Ming made his debut for the Bermuda national team in a December 2003 friendly match against Barbados and has earned over 40 caps since, making him the most capped player of the national team.

He featured in 13 FIFA World Cup qualification matches, scoring 4 goals.

References

External links
 
 profile at the Bermuda Hogges website

1978 births
Living people
People from Paget Parish
Association football wingers
Bermudian footballers
Bermuda international footballers
High Point Panthers men's soccer players
Barnet F.C. players
Maidenhead United F.C. players
Aylesbury United F.C. players
Hayes F.C. players
Northwood F.C. players
Bermuda Hogges F.C. players
Dandy Town Hornets F.C. players
USL League Two players
USL Second Division players
Bermudian expatriate footballers
Expatriate footballers in England
Bermudian expatriate sportspeople in England
Expatriate soccer players in the United States
Bermudian expatriate sportspeople in the United States